Jorge Luis Linck (26 March 1915 – 27 January 2007) was an Argentine sailor. He competed in the mixed 6 metres at the 1936 Summer Olympics.

References

External links
 

1915 births
2007 deaths
Olympic sailors of Argentina
Sailors at the 1936 Summer Olympics – 6 Metre
Argentine male sailors (sport)